Hilton is a village in Shropshire, England.

See also
Listed buildings in Worfield

References

External links

Villages in Shropshire